Joseph Sakr (1942 – 1997) was a popular Lebanese folkloric and pop singer and stage actor.

Career
Born in Bejdarfel, Joseph Sakr started as a school teacher teaching French. He later joined the Popular Lebanese Group (الفرقة الشعبية اللبنانية) accompanying performances of the Lebanese pan-Arab singer Fairuz and later on became a prominent singer with the Rahbani Brothers and appeared in a prominent or supporting roles in a great number of their musicals on stage including Lulu, Mays el Reem etc. His renditions "El haleh taabane, ya Laila", "Ana elli alayki meshtaq" and "'A hadeer el bosta" are renowned in Lebanon, the Levant and the Arab World. Sakr was also a regular feature in most of the stage plays of Ziad Rahbani.

Personal life
He was married to Ghada and had two children. His son Raji Sakr has also chosen a musical path.

Death
He died in Beirut in 1997.

Songs
(selective)
"El haleh taabane, ya Laila" (in Arabic الحالة تعبانة يا ليلى)
"Ana elli alayki meshtaq" (in Arabic أنا اللي عليكي مشتاق)
"'A hadeer el bosta" (in Arabic ع هدير البوسطة)

Appearances in musical plays
with Rahbani Brothers
1974: Lulu (in Arabic لولو) - as Fares Beik
1975: Mays el Reem (in Arabic ميس الريم) - as El Nasnass

with Ziad Rahbani
1973: Sahriyyeh (in Arabic سهرية) - in the role of Nakhle el Tennin
1974: Nazl el Srour (in Arabic نزل السرور) - in the role of Barakat
1978: Bil nisbeh la bukra shou? (in Arabic بالنسبة لبكرا شو؟) - in the role of Ramez
1980: Film Amerki taweel (in Arabic فيلم أميركي طويل) - in role of Abou Laila
1983: Shi fashel (in Arabic شي فاشل) as the mukhtar 
1993: Bi khsous el Karameh wel shaab el aneed (in Arabic بخصوص الكرامة والشعب العنيد) - in the role of Es Sarraf
1994: Lawla feshat el amal (in Arabic لولا فسحة الأمل)

References

1939 births
1997 deaths
20th-century Lebanese male singers
People from Qartaba